Cockroach is a Danger Danger album released in 2001 as a 2-CD set. One CD features singer Ted Poley and the other CD features singer Paul Laine.

The album was recorded in 1993 while Ted Poley was still the lead singer of the band. Shortly after finishing it, Poley was dismissed from the band and Paul Laine was hired as its new singer; he re-recorded the vocals in 1994. However, Poley sued the band and the label prohibiting its release. Epic decided to shelve it and the band went on with their career. The album was also the first to be recorded after Danger Danger parted ways with keyboardist Kasey Smith.

In 2001, Epic decided to release the album as a 2-CD set, including both versions. In 2004, Poley rejoined the band.

Track listing

Disc 1 (Paul Laine on vocals)
 "Still Kickin'" (Bruno Ravel, Steve West) - 4:17
 "Sick Little Twisted Mind" (Ravel, West, Andy Timmons) - 6:08
 "Good Time" (Ravel, West) - 3:42
 "Don't Break My Heart Again" (Ravel, West) - 4:40
 "Tip Of My Tongue" (Ravel, West) - 3:52
 "Walk It Like Ya Talk It" (Ravel, West) - 4:45
 "Goin' Goin' Gone"(Ravel, West, Timmons) - 3:49
 "Afraid Of Love" (Ravel, West) - 5:07
 "When She's Good She's Good (When She's Bad She's Better)" (Ravel, West) - 4:46
 "Shot O' Love" (Ravel, West) - 4:03
 "Don't Pull The Plug" (Ravel, West, Timmons) - 6:16
 "Time in a Bottle" (Jim Croce) - 2:56

Disc 2 (Ted Poley on vocals)
 "Still Kickin'" (Bruno Ravel, Steve West) - 4:17
 "When She's Good She's Good (When She's Bad She's Better)" (Ravel, West) - 4:46
 "Shot O' Love" (Ravel, West) - 4:03
 "Afraid Of Love" (Ravel, West) - 5:07
 "Tip Of My Tongue" (Ravel, West) - 3:52
 "Walk It Like Ya Talk It" (Ravel, West) - 4:45
 "Goin' Goin' Gone" (Ravel, West, Andy Timmons) - 3:49
 "Good Time" (Ravel, West) - 3:42
 "Don't Break My Heart Again" (Ravel, West) - 4:40
 "Don't Pull The Plug" (Ravel, West, Timmons) - 6:16
 "Sick Little Twisted Mind" (Ravel, West, Timmons) - 6:08

Personnel
 Paul Laine – vocals (disc 1 only)
 Ted Poley - vocals (disc 2 only)
 Andy Timmons – guitars
 Bruno Ravel – bass
 Steve West – drums

References

2001 albums
Danger Danger albums